was a Japanese  poet of the Kamakura period.

Biography 
This "name" translates to "Taira no Chikakiyo's fifth daughter", and her personal name is unknown.

She was the full sibling of Chikakiyo's fourth daughter. After entering religious orders she lived deep in Higashiyama.

Both her birth and death dates are unknown.

Poetry 
The Archives and Mausolea Department of the Imperial Household Agency has two books known as the  comprising 403 poems and 270 poems respectively. The ordering of the poems differs between the two collections, and each contains poems the other does not. These anthologies show she exchanged poetry with her mother, elder sister and niece (. She also had poems commissioned by the daughter of "the lord of  manor" (Kujō Michiie).

References

Citations

Works cited 

 
 

Waka poets
13th-century Japanese poets
Kuge
Year of birth unknown
Year of death unknown
Japanese women poets
13th-century Japanese women
Unidentified people
Taira clan